Braysville is an unincorporated community in the western part of Clay Township, Owen County, in the U.S. state of Indiana. It lies near the intersection of Freedom Road and Ranard Road, which is a community about six miles south of the city of Spencer, the county seat.  Its elevation is 735 feet (224 m), and it is located at  (39.2117117 -86.7744498).

History
Braysville was founded in 1860 by Hiram Bray, and named for him.

Geography
 Raccoon Creek is south of this community.

School districts
 Spencer-Owen Community Schools, including a high school.

Political districts
 State House District 46
 State Senate District 39

References

External links
 Roadside Thoughts for Braysville, Indiana

Unincorporated communities in Owen County, Indiana
Unincorporated communities in Indiana
Bloomington metropolitan area, Indiana